Transavia Airlines S.A.S., trading as Transavia France and formerly branded as transavia.com France, is a French low-cost airline owned by Air France S.A. & Transavia Airlines C.V. based at Paris-Orly Airport. It shares its corporate design, website and operating model with its Dutch mother company, Transavia.

History 
Transavia France was established as transavia.com France on 14 November 2006 by Air France and the Dutch airline Transavia (transavia.com back then) and began its operations in May 2007 operating scheduled and charter flights. Antoine Pussiau has been the CEO since January 2013.

Transavia France chiefly operates scheduled and charter services to leisure and some metropolitan destinations and is now positioned as part of Air France-KLM's joint low-cost brand which operates under the Transavia name in both the Netherlands and France. By early 2015, Transavia France, together with its Dutch sister company, received a new corporate design, dropping the ".com" from its public appearance as well as changing its primary colors from white/green/blue to white/green.

In 2018, Transavia France decided to further expand their base at Lyon Airport and at Nantes Airport with the addition of more based aircraft and the expansion of the existing routes.

In late November 2019, Transavia France stated that they will open a new base in Spring 2020 at Montpellier–Méditerranée Airport with a planned 20 routes served by the end of that year.

Corporate affairs

Ownership and structure 
Transavia France S.A.S. is 95.51% owned by Air France S.A. and 4.49% owned by Transavia Airlines C.V. of the Netherlands, both of which in turn are ultimately owned by Air France–KLM. Transavia is run as an independent operation, with both arms operating with an identical business model, website and image.

Business trends 
The performance figures for the Transavia brand operations (Transavia and Transavia France) are reported within the published annual accounts of their ultimate parent, Air France-KLM. The financials for both parts of the brand are fully incorporated in the Air France-KLM accounts.

Business model
Transavia operates as a low-cost carrier and, as such, uses a single aircraft type (Boeing 737 in their case) with a single class of cabin. The airline offers the "Assortment on Board" buy on board service offering food and drinks for purchase.

Head office
Transavia France is headquartered at Paris-Orly Airport in Paray Vieille Poste.

Destinations

The airline reaches in the summer 2022 100 destinations from Paris Orly and hence 1st low-cost company with Paris departures.

Fleet 

, Transavia France operates the following aircraft:

The expansion strategy includes 10 additional aircraft by year with roughly 71 planes for summer 2023 leading to a doubled fleet by 2025.

References

External links

Official website

Airlines of France
Airlines established in 2006
Companies based in Île-de-France
French companies established in 2006
Low-cost carriers
Air France–KLM
European Low Fares Airline Association

it:Transavia Airlines#Transavia France